Regal Princess is a  operated by Princess Cruises, a subsidiary of Carnival Corporation & plc, and is the second ship to sail for the cruise line under this name. Regal Princess, as well as her sister ship , were ordered on 17 February 2010 from Fincantieri and were constructed at the Fincantieri shipyard in Monfalcone, Italy, and debuted in 2014.

History

Construction and delivery
The final contract for the first two Royal-class vessels was signed on 4 May 2010. On 28 August 2012, the ship's keel was laid in Monfalcone and the name of the ship was also officially announced as Regal Princess. Her float-out ceremony was conducted on 26 March 2013 and she was floated free from the builder's dry dock on 29 March 2013 and then moored alongside the outfitting pier, where construction continued. Regal Princess successfully completed her sea trials in the Adriatic Sea from 16 to 21 April 2014.

Construction progressed faster than expected and the ship arrived 13 days ahead of schedule. She was delivered to Princess Cruises on 11 May 2014 in a ceremony at Fincantieri's shipyard in Monfalcone. She had her official naming ceremony in Fort Lauderdale, Florida, on 5 November 2014 and was officially christened by the original cast of The Love Boat: Gavin MacLeod, Fred Grandy, Ted Lange, Bernie Kopell, Lauren Tewes, and Jill Whelan.

Operational history
The debut of Regal Princess was conducted earlier than originally scheduled, due to an earlier delivery. The maiden voyage had been scheduled for 2 June 2014, but was moved up to 20 May. The ship conducted a four-night pre-inaugural cruise from 16 to 20 May 2014 from Trieste that visited Kotor. The maiden voyage departed from Venice on 20 May 2014 for Corfu, Mykonos, and an overnight call in Istanbul. She spent her inaugural season in the Mediterranean before departing Venice on 17 October 2014 to reposition to Port Everglades for her American debut, sailing Eastern Caribbean itineraries.

From 2014 to 2020, she sailed the Caribbean during the winter months from Port Everglades and the Baltic region in Northern Europe during the summer season, with five-to-seven-day voyages to the New England coast and the Maritimes from New York during the fall.

In summer 2020, she was scheduled to operate her first season in the British Isles before repositioning to Australia in fall 2020 for her maiden season in Oceania. However, due to the COVID-19 pandemic, all British Isles voyages were cancelled. In summer 2021, Regal Princess was set to debut in Seattle to cruise her first Alaska season, but fleet redeployments later scheduled her to return to Europe and homeport in Southampton during that time frame. In 2022, Regal Princess was the setting of the American and Australian versions of the reality show The Real Love Boat, which aired on CBS and Network 10.

Design and specifications
As a sister ship to Royal Princess, Regal Princess shares many of the same dimensions, features, and overall design. Main propulsion is via two propellers, each driven by a  electric motor. The ship houses 1,780 passenger cabins and 751 crew cabins. Of the 1,780 passenger cabins, 81% have a balcony. The ship has a maximum capacity of 5,600 passengers and crew.

Describing the style that inspired much of the interior design on Regal Princess, Giacomo Mortola, head architect at ship design firm GEM, explained:

Notable features aboard the ship include a multi-level atrium, a theater, various dining rooms and restaurants, and pools.

Incidents

March 2019 rescue
On 5 March 2019, Regal Princess rescued two survivors after their private plane crashed into the Caribbean near Grand Turk. The cruise line released a statement, saying "Princess Cruises can confirm that upon request from the U.S. Coast Guard, Regal Princess assisted in the rescue of two U.S. citizens whose private aircraft went down southeast of Grand Turk in the Caribbean Sea. Both people rescued sailed onboard Regal Princess as the ship sailed to the next port of call St. Thomas."

COVID-19 pandemic

On 7 March 2020, two crew members of Regal Princess were tested and the docking of the ship at Port Everglades in Fort Lauderdale, Florida, U.S., was delayed for about a day while waiting for test results. The tests were negative, and the crew did not have respiratory complications, so the ship was allowed to dock.

On 10 May 2020, a 39-year-old female Ukrainian crew member of Regal Princess died after going overboard from the ship while it was docked in Rotterdam. One source stated that she had committed suicide, and she had been scheduled to be repatriated on a charter flight which was subsequently cancelled.  She was reportedly distraught and last seen crying aboard the ship.

References

External links

 
"Regal Princess: Sister to 'Kate Middleton's ship' may be the bridesmaid but she's still so impressive" – review by John Honeywell, aka Captain Greybeard, in the Daily Mirror

Ships of Princess Cruises
Ships built in Monfalcone
Ships built by Fincantieri
2013 ships